Mela is a 1980 Malayalam-language Indian film directed by K. G. George, starring Raghu, Anjali Naidu, and Mammootty.  It is noted for starring the shortest actor (Raghu) as the protagonist and in a full-length character.

Plot 
The protagonist, working as a clown in a circus in the town, comes to visit his village. He is looking for a bride. The heroine, a tall lady, gets charmed by the wealthiness (compared to the other citizens of the village) of the protagonist even though he is a dwarf. She assents to marriage. Married, they go to the town to join the circus camp.

Things come to a different world when they reach the circus. Here the clown is a very insignificant figure. His wife sees the difference very quick. She soon gets attracted to a heroic figure in the circus camp—motorcycle stuntsman Vijayan (Mammootty). They show the signs of moving into an affair. Some drama follows and the protagonist, the clown, hands over his wife to the bike jumper and commits suicide.

Cast 
Raghu as Govindan Kutty, a circus clown, the protagonist.
Anjali Naidu as Sharada, the wife of the protagonist.
Mammootty as Vijayan, a bike jumper in the circus
Iringal Narayani as the mother of protagonist (Raghu)
K. G. Pinarayi
Mohan Elias (Sumesh)
Sreenivasan as Balan
Sharaff as Ramesh – Circus Manager
Bhaskara Kurup

Soundtrack 
The music was composed by M. K. Arjunan and M. B. Sreenivasan and the lyrics were written by O. N. V. Kurup and Mullanezhi.

References 

1980s Malayalam-language films
Films shot in Kochi
Films directed by K. G. George
Indian drama films
Films about people with dwarfism